The Ordnance QF 15-pounder gun, commonly referred to as the Ehrhardt, was a modern German field gun purchased by Britain in 1900 as a stopgap measure to upgrade its field artillery to modern QF standards, while it developed its own alternative. This was precipitated by the experience of the British Army in South Africa during the Second Boer War, where its standard field gun, the BL 15-pounder, was out-performed by modern French and German field guns deployed by the Boers. It bore no relation to the BL 15-pounder or BLC 15-pounder, two other guns in British service at the time, other than a common shell.

History 
The gun's original design and supply to Britain included no shield, all-steel wheels, axle-tree seats, and a sprung telescoping trail to help with recoil control. The British found the trail unsatisfactory in service, so they permanently pinned it in the closed position. The British also immediately replaced the original all-steel wheels with standard British wooden spoked wheels.

It replaced the obsolete BL 12-pounder 6 cwt gun in Royal Horse Artillery service until the QF 13-pounder became available from 1904.

When the Territorial Force was formed in 1908 the guns were assigned to its cavalry units, known as Yeomanry. The axle-tree seats were removed as unnecessary because the gunners rode horses, and gun shields were added. The modified carriage was designated Mk I+.

This gun is the "15-pounder" to which writers are referring in World War I if they are referring to Royal Horse Artillery (RHA) batteries of the Territorial Force, or Yeomanry. The other "15-pounder", the BLC 15-pounder, was an unrelated gun used by Royal Field Artillery (RFA) batteries of the Territorial Force, although it was also issued to some second line RHA batteries raised in 1914.

Combat service 

The gun was used by Royal Horse Artillery batteries of Territorial Force cavalry units (Yeomanry) early in World War I, most notably in the campaign in Egypt against the Senussi by 1/A Battery, Honourable Artillery Company and the 1/1st Nottinghamshire Royal Horse Artillery.

B Battery, Honourable Artillery Company and Berkshire RHA were in action with these guns in the recapture of Sheikh Othman from the Turks on 20 July 1915, part of the Aden campaign.

From 1916 the QF 15-pounder was replaced by the modern 13-pounders and 18-pounders.

Ammunition 
54,000 complete rounds (i.e. shell, fuze, cartridge) of German design and manufacture were originally supplied with the guns. These were replaced by British manufactures when used up. The following diagrams show British-made ammunition available in World War I.

See also 
 List of field guns

Notes

References

Bibliography 

 Mark Connelly, The British Campaign in Aden, 1914–1918
 General Sir Martin Farndale, History of the Royal Regiment of Artillery. The Forgotten Fronts and the Home Base, 1914–1918. London: Royal Artillery Institution, 1988. 

 I.V. Hogg & L.F. Thurston. British Artillery Weapons & Ammunition 1914–1918. London: Ian Allan, 1972

External links 

 Handbook for the 15-pr. Q.F. Gun Field Batteries 1905 via State Library of Victoria
 Handbook for the 15-pr. Q.F. Gun : Movable Armament and Territorial Force. (R.H.A.) London : HMSO 1910 via State Library of Victoria
 15–PR Q.F. Gun: Section Gun Drill 1915 via State Library of Victoria
 Diagram of 15pr Quick Fire Field Gun Mark I at Victorian Forts and Artillery website

QF 15 pounder
QF 15 pounder
QF 15 pounder
QF 15 pounder
Rheinmetall